The Fort Pierce Bombers were a professional minor league baseball team based in Fort Pierce, Florida from 1940 until 1942. The clubs played in the Class-D Florida East Coast League. The league and the team both shut their doors, along with many other minor leagues, a few months after the United States entered World War II, and, despite the postwar baseball boom, they were not revived.

References
Johnson, Lloyd and Wolff, Miles, eds., The Encyclopedia of Minor League Baseball, 3d edition. Durham, North Carolina: Baseball America, 2007.

Defunct minor league baseball teams
Defunct baseball teams in Florida
Fort Pierce, Florida
Baseball teams disestablished in 1942
Baseball teams established in 1940
1940 establishments in Florida
1942 disestablishments in Florida